Boreing is an unincorporated community in Laurel County, in the U.S. state of Kentucky.

History
A post office was established at Boreing in 1884, and remained in operation until it was discontinued in 1971. The community was named for Vincent Boreing, a Kentucky politician.

References

Unincorporated communities in Laurel County, Kentucky
Unincorporated communities in Kentucky